Centrocestus armatus is a species of trematodes, or fluke worms, in the family Heterophyidae.

Distribution
This species occurs in Japan, Taiwan, Korea, Southeast Asia.

Life cycle
The first intermediate hosts of Centrocestus armatus include freshwater snails Semisulcospira libertina.

The second intermediate host include fish Nipponocypris temminkii and Zacco platypus.

The final hosts include Black-crowned night heron Nycticorax nycticorax.

It may infect humans.

References

Further reading 
 Kimura D. & Uga S. (2005). "Epidemiological study on Centrocestus armatus metacercariae in Chikusa River, Hyogo Prefecture, Japan". Tropical Medicine and Health 33:7–11.
 Paller V. G. V. & Uga S. (2008). "Attachment and Penetration of Centrocestus armatus (Digenea: Heterophyidae) Cercariae to Gills of Secondary Intermediate Fish Hosts". Journal of Parasitology 94(3): 578–583. .

Heterophyidae